Eyot is a jazz fusion band from Niš, Serbia that formed in 2008. The group won the  MIDEM OFF Competition in 2012 .

Style 
Their music represents the musicians hungering for a fresh sound, blending the culture of jazz, the sophistication of classical piano, the gritty elements of East European folk music, and just a hint of smooth electronic fusion.

Members 
 Dejan Ilijić – piano
 Slađan Milenović – guitar
 Miloš Vojvodić – drums
 Marko Stojiljković – bass

Discography 
 Horizon (2010) 
 Drifters (2013) 
 Similarity (2014) 
 Innate (2017) 
557799 (2020)

References 

General references

External links 
 
 EYOT

Serbian jazz ensembles
Serbian jazz musicians
Serbian jazz
Culture in Niš
Serbian music